Wistanswick is a small village, located in the parish of Stoke upon Tern in Shropshire, England. It is located in a rural area approximately five miles south of Market Drayton just off the A41. The village contains a public house (pictured right) and a URC chapel.

See also
Listed buildings in Stoke upon Tern

Villages in Shropshire